The  is a 15th-century scroll containing both text and illustrations describing Ashikaga Mochiuji's seppuku and Yūki Ujitomo's rebellion against shōgun Ashikaga Yoshinori (the Yūki Kassen).  It is 28.80 cm long, 378.20 cm wide. The scroll is an Important Cultural Property.

References
Shihon Chakushoku Yūki Kassen Ekotoba, Cultural Heritage Online  accessed on July 23, 2009

15th century in Japan
Emakimono
Japanese chronicles